Persoonia flexifolia is a plant in the family Proteaceae and is endemic to the south-west of Western Australia.

Description
Persoonia flexifolia is an erect shrub with its young branchlets covered with whitish or greyish hairs. Flowering occurs from December to January.

Taxonomy
Persoonia flexifolia was first formally described in 1810 by Robert Brown in Transactions of the Linnean Society of London.

Distribution and habitat
This geebung is only known from collections made at Lucky Bay and the Lort River in the Esperance Plains biogeographic region where it was growing in low heath.

Conservation status
Persoonia flexifolia is classified as "Priority One" by the Government of Western Australia Department of Parks and Wildlife, meaning that it is known from only one or a few locations which are potentially at risk.

References

flexifolia
Flora of Western Australia
Proteales of Australia
Plants described in 1810
Taxa named by Robert Brown (botanist, born 1773)